Maximos Salloum (born 2 December 1920 in Yaroun, Lebanon - died on 28 October 2004) was Archbishop of the Melkite Greek Catholic Archeparchy of Akka in Israel from 1975 to 1997. The bishop's seat is in Haifa.

Life

On July 20, 1946, Salloum received his ordination to the priesthood and became on August 20, 1975 Archbishop of Akka, Haifa, Nazareth and all Galilee. His ordination was on 14 September 1975 by Patriarch of Antioch Maximos V Hakim. As co-consecrators assisted the archbishops Georges Haddad of Tyre and Joseph Tawil of Newton (USA). In 1982, Salloum founded a social institution in the Madonna Church in Haifa built in 1862 available today has "house of grace". On 23 July 1997 the archbishop became emeritus until his death as retired Archbishop of Akka. In 2004 Salloum died and was succeeded by Archbishop Boutros Mouallem.

References

External links
 http://www.catholic-hierarchy.org/bishop/bsalloum.html 
 http://www.gcatholic.org/dioceses/diocese/akka0.htm

1920 births
2004 deaths
Lebanese Melkite Greek Catholics
Melkite Greek Catholic bishops
20th-century Roman Catholic bishops in Israel